Suhas V. Patankar (born 22 February 1941) is an Indian mechanical engineer. He is a pioneer in the field of computational fluid dynamics (CFD) and Finite volume method. He is currently a Professor Emeritus at the University of Minnesota. He is also president of Innovative Research, Inc. Patankar was born in Pune, Maharashtra, India.

Early life and education 
Patankar received his bachelor's degree in mechanical engineering in 1962 from the College of Engineering, Pune, which is affiliated to the University of Pune and his Master of Technology degree in mechanical engineering from the Indian Institute of Technology Bombay in 1964. In 1967 he received his Ph.D. in mechanical engineering from the Imperial College, University of London.

Career 
Patankar's most important contribution to the field of CFD is the SIMPLE algorithm that he developed along with his colleagues at Imperial College. Patankar is the author of a book in computational fluid dynamics titled Numerical Heat Transfer and Fluid Flow which was first published in 1980. This book has since been considered one of the groundbreaking contributions to computational fluid dynamics due to its emphasis on physical understanding and insight into the fluid flow and heat transfer phenomena. He is also one of  the most cited authors in science and engineering.

References 

1941 births
Living people
American mechanical engineers
Indian mechanical engineers
Computational fluid dynamicists
Savitribai Phule Pune University alumni
Alumni of Imperial College London
IIT Bombay alumni
Scientists from Pune
20th-century Indian engineers
20th-century Indian physicists
Indian fluid dynamicists